Tomislav Ivčić (6 January 1953 – 4 March 1993) was a Croatian pop singer, songwriter and politician. He died in a car accident and is buried in Zagreb at the Mirogoj Cemetery.

A native of Zadar, Tomislav Ivčić became one of the most popular singers and songwriters during his appearances on 1970s pop music festivals. His specialty was pop music inspired by Dalmatian folklore. One of his early hits included the country-rock influenced single "Nemam za kavu" from 1979. Ivčić also wrote and performed "Večeras je naša fešta", a song that would become a semi-official anthem of Dalmatia, often sung and performed whenever a Dalmatian athlete or sports team won a title or important game. He has written over two hundred songs and released twenty three albums during his career.

During the war in Croatia, Ivčić wrote the song "Stop the War in Croatia" which charted in the Top 10 in Australia in 1991. In February 1993 he ran as independent candidate for House of Chambers of Croatian Parliament, and won a seat. A few weeks before he was supposed to take office, and shortly after a Globus interview in which he was described as the "first Croatian senator," his automobile was involved in a traffic accident that would claim the lives of him and three other people.

His older half-brother Đani Maršan is also an accomplished singer and songwriter, as well as his other older brother Vedran Ivčić, albeit to a lesser degree.

Discography

Singles

References

External links
Discography of Tomislav Ivčić
Tomislav Ivčić

1953 births
1993 deaths
Croatian pop singers
Croatian songwriters
Musicians from Zadar
Road incident deaths in Croatia
Burials at Mirogoj Cemetery
20th-century Croatian male singers
Croatian Democratic Union politicians
Politicians from Zadar
Yugoslav male singers